Simeone may refer to:
Carmelo Simeone (1934–2014), Argentine former football player
Diego Simeone (born 1970), Argentine football manager and former player
Lee Jason Simeone (born 1980), English musician
Giovanni Simeone (born 1995), Argentine football player, son of Diego Simeone
Osvaldo Simeone, American engineer

See also
 Simeoni